Harmony is an unincorporated community in Nacogdoches County, located in the U.S. state of Texas.
It is referenced in the novel RoseBlood by A.G. Howard.

References

Unincorporated communities in Nacogdoches County, Texas
Unincorporated communities in Texas